Madison Thompson (born August 13, 2000) is an American actress. She is best known for her portrayal of Erin Pierce on the Netflix series, Ozark. She has also held guest and recurring roles on other television shows, including American Housewife, NCIS: New Orleans, and Kevin (Probably) Saves the World.

Early life and education

Thompson was born and raised in Atlanta, Georgia. She also partially grew up in New York City. She attended high school at the Lovett School in Atlanta where she participated in several stage productions. In 2018, Thompson was nominated for the Shuler Hensley Award for Best Performance By a Supporting Actress for her role as Wendy in a school production of Peter Pan. She graduated from the Lovett School in 2019. Thompson is currently attending the University of Southern California (USC) where she is a Presidential Scholar pursuing a business degree in cinematic arts. She is also studying for a minor in musical theater at USC's Thornton School of Music.

Career

Thompson achieved her first major television roles in 2016, appearing on an episode of TNT's Major Crimes and on Nickelodeon's Henry Danger that year. In 2017 and 2018, she had recurring roles on Fox's Shots Fired and on ABC's Kevin (Probably) Saves the World. She later appeared on single episodes of NCIS: New Orleans, Creepshow, and American Housewife. In July 2019, it was announced that Thompson had been added to the cast for season three of the Netflix series Ozark as Erin Pierce. The third season was released onto Netflix in March 2020. The following year, she was cast in the role of Jordan on The Young and the Restless.

In January 2022, Thompson was cast in a leading role for the Paramount+ series Grease: Rise of the Pink Ladies.

Filmography

References

External links
 
 Official website

Living people
Actresses from Atlanta
21st-century American actresses
The Lovett School alumni
University of Southern California people
American television actresses
American child actresses
2000 births